Service Merchandise was a retail chain of catalog showrooms carrying jewelry, toys, sporting goods, and electronics. The company, which first began in 1934 as a five-and-dime store, was in existence for 68 years before ceasing operations in 2002.

History
Service Merchandise's history can be traced back to 1934, to a small five-and-dime store founded by Harry and Mary Zimmerman in the town of Pulaski, Tennessee. After leaving the wholesale business, they opened Service Merchandise, Inc., the first of what evolved into a chain of catalog showrooms opened in 1960 at 309 Broadway in downtown Nashville, Tennessee.

During the 1970s and 1980s, Service Merchandise was a leading catalog-showroom retailer. At its peak, the company achieved more than $4 billion in annual sales. As the company expanded, it began to open showrooms nationwide, mostly in the vicinity of major shopping malls, which were in vogue in the 1970s. In the early 1980s, the Service Merchandise headquarters moved from Nashville to nearby Brentwood, Tennessee, becoming one of the first businesses to plant itself in the area that is now known as Cool Springs. In May 1985, Service Merchandise acquired the H. J. Wilson Co. for approximately $200 million. Raymond Zimmerman, the CEO, was attracted to Wilson's stores to gain a stronger foothold in the Sun Belt states. Service Merchandise also had other wholly owned subsidiaries featuring retail stores such as Zim's Jewelers, HomeOwners Warehouse (later called Mr. HOW Warehouse), The Lingerie Store, and The Toy Store.

Service Merchandise was a prominent sponsor of Wheel of Fortune. The retailer also provided some of the prizes on The Price Is Right, Classic Concentration, Shop 'til You Drop on The Family Channel, and Shopping Spree.

Downfall
The company lost market share in its housewares and electronics sectors to giant discounters such as Walmart and Bed Bath & Beyond, and later Best Buy and Circuit City. Although Service Merchandise was early to embrace the Internet in the 1990s, generating tens of millions of dollars in sales, it was not enough to offset the damage done by the mega-chain stores springing up nationwide. Until its closure, however, Service Merchandise enjoyed a strong jewelry department, continuing as the largest watch retailer in the United States.

Gary M. Witkin was appointed to the new position of president and chief operating officer in 1994.

The company responded to the market pressures with a series of restructuring plans that included the discontinuation of unprofitable product lines such as electronics, toys and sporting goods, and refocusing on jewelry, gifts, and home decor products. Many of their showrooms were also closed or downsized significantly. During this time, the company was successful in sub-dividing a number of its company-owned stores into two or three units and sub-leasing the newly created spaces to other national chains, thus reducing costs and generating more store traffic.

Bankruptcy and liquidation

While in the process of changing its retail format, a group of creditors forced an involuntary petition for bankruptcy under Chapter 11 on March 15, 1999, seeking court supervision of the company's restructuring. The company later filed a voluntary Chapter 11 petition to improve relations with its vendors and creditors in an effort to stabilize its business.

Raymond Zimmerman, son of the original founders (who had been instrumental in the process of building the family business into a multibillion-dollar chain) resigned as chairman of the board in November 2000. The company attempted to pull itself out of bankruptcy once again in summer 2001, but the economic downturn following the September 11 attacks proved to be a hurdle the company could not clear.
With only 200 catalog showrooms left, the stock valued at less than one cent per share, and no profitability in sight, Service Merchandise ceased operations and shuttered all of its remaining stores by early 2002.

Showroom ordering process

Service Merchandise had an unusual ordering process which emphasized the catalog, even within the showrooms. Although other chains such as Brendle's, Best Products, Sterling Jewelry & Distributing Company, and McDade's used this model, none were as successful as Service Merchandise, however they too eventually suffered the same fate.

The reason behind offering the catalog showroom approach to retailing was that it reduced the risk of merchandise theft (known in the industry as shrinkage) and also enabled customers to shop without the inconvenience of physically dragging purchases throughout the store. The downside to this approach was that it required the customers to give their names, addresses, and phone numbers with each order. The risk of identity theft made some customers wary of shopping in such stores, particularly when purchasing simple household items such as batteries.

For non-jewelry orders, customers would enter the showroom and receive a carbon-paper order form and clipboard to record the catalog numbers of desired items. Items were displayed in working order in the showroom, allowing customers to test products as they shopped. Current Service Merchandise catalogs were placed on stands in strategic locations throughout the store to allow customers to shop for items not on display. When ready to place their orders, customers would take the order form to a clerk who would submit the order to the store's stockroom via his computer terminal cash register, as well as take payment for the items. The customer would then move to the "Merchandise Pickup Area" near the exit, where the order would emerge from the stockroom on a conveyor belt. 

This process was altered in the late 1980s to allow customers to place their own orders on a number of self-service computer kiosks named "Silent Sam," which the company later renamed "Service Express."

In addition to jewelry and catalog showroom display items, Service Merchandise also had several self-service items which were located on shelves and taken by the customer to checkout as in a traditional retail store. These items included many children's toys as well as smaller, consumer or commodity items such as batteries, film, and video cassettes.

The jewelry department, which was featured prominently in the center of every showroom, operated on a first-come, first-served system, in which each customer would be individually served by a jewelry clerk.

Also in the mid-1980s, Service Merchandise experimented with the installation of drive-through windows at two showrooms (near Chicago and Nashville), allowing customers with phone-in orders to pick up their orders without leaving their automobiles. The concept was not expanded beyond its test stores, but remained in place at those locations.

In the mid-1990s, the hand-filled paper forms were replaced with barcoded pull tags placed on/near each item in the showroom. Customers gathered these for products they wished to buy, and took these to the cashier to complete the sale in the previous manner, retrieved from the stockroom. By the late 1990s, many of the showrooms had been converted to allow a more traditional approach to shopping in addition to the catalog ordering process. By 2000, all of the remaining showrooms had been downsized and the catalog-style shopping approach was officially abandoned.

Support of the Muscular Dystrophy Association

Service Merchandise was known as one of the largest corporate donors to the Muscular Dystrophy Association during its time as an established company. Chairman/CEO Raymond Zimmerman would appear multiple times on the yearly Jerry Lewis MDA Telethon to present donations on behalf of the company and its customers. Around each showroom were several collection boxes for MDA, and each store also sold MDA fundraising shamrocks at St. Patrick's Day. Even during its bankruptcy and liquidation, Service Merchandise continued to be a large supporter of MDA.

See also

 Argos - a comparable UK big box operation featuring similar goods and catalogue-warehouse fulfillment
 Best Products
 Brendle's - a regional competitor in the southeastern United States
 Consumers Distributing - a similar (and also failed) retailer in Canada and the US
 Witmark - a regional competitor in Michigan

References

Retail companies established in 1934
Retail companies disestablished in 2002
Consumer electronics retailers in the United States
Online retailers of the United States
Catalog showrooms
Companies that filed for Chapter 11 bankruptcy in 1999
1934 establishments in Tennessee
2002 disestablishments in Tennessee